United Nations Security Council resolution 811, adopted unanimously on 12 March 1993, after reaffirming resolutions 696 (1991), 747 (1992), 785 (1992), 793 (1992) and 804 (1993), the Council expressed its concern at recent fighting and condemned the violations of the "Acordos de Paz" peace agreement in Angola by UNITA, including its rejection of election results and negotiations in addition to its resumption of hostilities.

The resolution demanded UNITA accept the election results and that both it and the Government of Angola produce evidence that they, particularly UNITA, have implemented the "Acordos de Paz", by 30 March 1993. It also demanded a ceasefire throughout the country and to enter into dialogue, reaffirming that it will hold responsible any party which refuses to take part in such a dialogue.

The Council then condemned verbal and physical attacks against Margaret Anstee, Special Representative of the Secretary-General Boutros Boutros-Ghali and the United Nations Angola Verification Mission II (UNAVEM II), including the kidnapping of one member of UNAVEM II in Cabinda Province, further demanding that all parties ensure the safety of all United Nations personnel.

The resolution invited Boutros-Ghali to organise a meeting at the highest level between the two parties before 30 April 1993, and to consider the future of the United Nations in Angola as a whole. It concluded by calling on all United Nations agencies, Member States and international humanitarian organisations to provide economic, material and technical assistance in addition to humanitarian aid to the civilian population. This provision was added to the resolution after concerns about the humanitarian situation in Angola by Margaret Anstee.

See also
 Angolan Civil War
 Angolan legislative election, 1992
 Angolan presidential election, 1992
 List of United Nations Security Council Resolutions 801 to 900 (1993–1994)
 United Nations Angola Verification Mission III

References

External links
 
Text of the Resolution at undocs.org

 0811
1993 in Angola
 0811
Angolan Civil War
March 1993 events